Saccharomyces arboricolus is a species of ascomycetous yeast in first isolated from tree bark. Its type strain is H-6T (=AS 2.3317T =CBS 10644T).

References

Further reading

External links

arboricolus
Fungi described in 2000